France v James Coombes & Co [1929] AC 496 is an old UK labour law case, concerning the definition of ‘employee’ for the purpose of section 8 of the Trade Boards Act 1909 and the Trade Boards Act 1918.

Facts
The Minister of Labour under the Trade Boards Act 1909 and the Trade Boards Act 1918 made an order applicable to boot and shop repairing called the Trade Boards (Boot and Shoe Repairing) Order 1919. This established a trade board to fix minimum rates of wages for managers and other classes of workers in the trade. It did so and the Minister of Labour confirmed them by an order on 8 August 1922. Mr France claimed the minimum wage applied to him from his employer, James Coombes & Co. He repaired boots, and so was physically working, for less than half the time he was in the shop. The employer contended that taking this into account he was receiving the minimum wage.

MacKinnon J at the King's Bench and Scrutton LJ, Sankey LJ, and Romer J in the Court of Appeal held that when the manager was not actually working, there was no entitlement to be paid.

Judgment
The House of Lords, by a majority, held that Mr France was not to be considered employed "all the time during which he was present" at the shop under TBA 1918 s 8, because in that time he was "so present for some purpose unconnected with his work and other than that of waiting for work to be given to him to perform."

Lord Blanesburgh dissented, his judgment read by Lord Atkin. He would have allowed the appeal.

See also

UK labour law

Notes

References

United Kingdom labour case law
House of Lords cases
1929 in case law
1929 in British law
Shoemaking